Calvin C. Stoll (December 12, 1923 – August 25, 2000) was an American football player and coach.  He played Defensive End for the Minnesota Golden Gophers in the 1948 and 1949 seasons. Before graduating from Minnesota in June 1950, Stoll was named the head coach at Mound High School (later renamed to Mound Westonka High School) on May 10, 1950. At Mound High School, he achieved a 6-1 record and a Lake Conference co-championship. After the 1950 high school football season, Stoll jumped to the college ranks where he served as an assistant coach from 1951 to 1968. As an assistant coach at Michigan State, he helped the team achieve back to back National Championships in 1965 and 1966. He served as the head coach at Wake Forest University from 1969 to 1971  where he led the Demon Deacons to their first Atlantic Coast Conference (ACC) Championship in 1970. Stoll then served as the head coach at the University of Minnesota from 1972 to 1978. Stoll's most notable season at Minnesota was in 1977 when he led the Golden Gophers to a 16-0 shutout victory over top ranked Michigan and a trip to the 1977 Hall of Fame Classic Bowl game. Stoll finished his college coaching career after the 1978 season, compiling a career college football record of 54–56.

In the spring of 1986, Stoll relocated to Italy to become the  head coach of Italian amateur football team Warriors Bologna, and won the Italian Bowl VI at Bologna on July 5, 1986. The 1986 Warriors Bologna season would be Stoll's last football coaching role as serious health problems would force Stoll into retirement.

After returning to the United States, Stoll would be diagnosed with idiopathic cardiomyopathy, which is a degeneration of the heart muscle, of unknown origin. Stoll would undergo a heart transplant on July 23, 1987.

In 1988, Stoll and other fellow heart transplant recipients, started Second Chance for Life, a support group for heart transplant patients. Also, in 1988, Stoll would be inducted into the Minnesota Football Coaches Association Hall of Fame. 

After a month long illness due to heart complications, Stoll would die on August 25, 2000, 13 years after his heart transplant. In 2001, the Minnesota Football Coaches Association (MFCA) established the Cal Stoll Award. The Cal Stoll Award is given annually by MFCA to an individual connected to football in the State of Minnesota who has overcome adversity.

Head coaching record

High school

College

AIFA Serie A

References

External links
 Big Ten Network Twitter Page - 1974 Video of Cal Stoll celebrating a Minnesota Gophers win in the locker room.
 

1923 births
2000 deaths
Denver Pioneers football coaches
Georgia Bulldogs football coaches
Michigan State Spartans football coaches
Minnesota Golden Gophers football players
Minnesota Golden Gophers football coaches
Utah State Aggies football coaches
Wake Forest Demon Deacons football coaches
High school football coaches in Minnesota
People from Cass County, North Dakota
Heart transplant recipients